The old Rottweil Synagogue is a synagogue in Rottweil in Baden-Württemberg. It was established in 1861.
The construction of a new synagogue in Rottweil began in March 2016.

History 
There is no proof of a synagogue in the 14th century, even though there was a Jewish community. In 1349, Black death led to slaughters of Jews in Rottweil as well as everywhere in Europe. Judengasse and Judenschule (“Jews’ school”, that is to say, synagogue) are documented in 1355, a Judenbad (mikvah) before 1838.
In 1806, a younger Jewish community in Rottweil was founded as a branch of Mühringen.
In 1924 the Israelitische Gemeinde Rottweil, the Jewish community, became independent.

In 1813 Jews in Rottweil asked Frederick I of Württemberg for the profaned church of St John the Baptist in order to establish a synagogue there. The church was part of the former Kommende of  Knights Hospitaller.
In 1861, the Synagogenbauverein acquired the building from the former mayor Dr. Rapp and furnished it with a prayer room the same year. In 1865, the Jewish commune in Rottweil bought the building. A description is given by Dr. Michael Silberstein in 1875.
It was completely renovated in the 1920s.
In the 1938 Kristallnacht, the prayer room was demolished by members of the SA. They also burned the Torah on the street. The memorial plaques with the names of Jewish soldiers in the first world war were destroyed.

Due to a forced confiscation in December 1938, the Israelitische Kirchengemeinde in Rottweil sold the synagogue, including a teacher's apartment, to Wilhelm Ziefle, a businessman in Rottweil. A Jewish merchant, Wilhelm Wälder, was allowed to stay until 1939.

His wife Emilie Wälder was an eyewitness and depicted the happenings in the Kristallnacht, the extent of the devastation in the synagogue, the temporary arrest of her husband in the Dachau concentration camp, as well as the daily fear of being deported when it became known that the Jews in the region were deported to the Gurs internment camp in southern France since fall 1940. Wilhelm/William and Emilie Wälder (widow Rosinus, born Reinheimer) were able to emigrate in May 1941 to the US.

After 1945 the building was hired out. The prayer room was renovated from 1979 to 1981. During the renovation, the remains of paintings were found, e. g. Die Palme des Gerechten (Psalm 92, verse 13).

Today the prayer room is used as a driving school.

On March 20, 2016 a foundation stone ceremony for a new Synagogue building was held in Rottweil.
According to the words of Rami Suleiman, Oberratsvorsitzender of the Israelitische Religionsgemeinschaft Baden, the foundation stone comes from the Temple Mount in Jerusalem and represents something extraordinary: it came from the very place where Solomon's Temple stood until its destruction. The Stone was framed into the wall in such a way that it can be touched by the members of the Jewish Community. It symbolizes the connection to Israel and reminds the members of the Community of the place of refuge in times of peril.

Literature 
 Klaus-Dieter Alicke: Lexikon der jüdischen Gemeinden im deutschen Sprachraum. 3 Bände. Gütersloher Verlagshaus, Gütersloh 2008, . (Online-Version)
 Joachim Hahn und Jürgen Krüger: Synagogen in Baden-Württemberg: "Hier ist nichts anderes als Gottes Haus". Rüdiger Schmidt (Hrsg.), Bd. 2 Orte und Einrichtungen/von Joachim Hahn (Gedenkbuch der Synagogen in Deutschland: Baden-Württemberg, 4), Stuttgart 2007, 
 Winfried Hecht (Hrsg.): Reichskristallnacht in Rottweil 1938-1988. Quellen und Materialien. Rottweil 1988.
 Robert H. Klein: alias Anton Kampitsch (1877-1931): Beiträge zur Geschichte der Juden in Rottweil a. N., Rottweil [1924], hrsg. von Stadtarchiv Rottweil und Arbeitskreis Ehemalige Synagoge Rottweil, Haigerloch 2004, .
 Landesarchivdirektion Baden-Württemberg in Verbindung mit dem Landkreis Rottweil (Hrsg.): Der Landkreis Rottweil Bd. I, 2003 (2. Aufl.), S. 222–223 (Jüdisches Leben).
 Emily C. Rose: Portraits of Our Past: Jews of the German Countryside, Philadelphia 2001.
 Michael Silberstein: Historisch-topographische Beschreibung des Bezirksrabbinats Mühringen 1875. In: Lebensspuren auf dem jüdischen Friedhof in Mühringen. Gräber im Wald. Dokumentation des Friedhofs, der über 300 Jahre in Mühringen ansässigen Gemeinde und des Rabbinats Mühringen (= Jüdische Friedhöfe der Stadt Horb, Bd. II), hrsg. von Stadtarchiv Horb und Träger- und Förderverein Ehemalige Synagoge Rexingen, S. 123-146.

External links 

 Die Synagoge in Rottweil bei Alemannia Judaica (mit Innenaufnahmen)
 Leo-bw Ehemalige Synagoge Rottweil 
 Werner Kessl: Ehemalige Synagoge Rottweil, pdf (143 KB) vom Server der Landeszentrale für politische Bildung.

References 

Synagogues in Germany
Rottweil (district)
Synagogues completed in 1861
Synagogues destroyed during Kristallnacht (Germany)
Religious buildings and structures in Baden-Württemberg
Classicist architecture in Germany
Buildings and structures in Rottweil (district)